Vučja Gomila is a village in the Municipality of Moravske Toplice in the Prekmurje region of Slovenia.

References

External links

Vučja Gomila on Geopedia

Populated places in the Municipality of Moravske Toplice